Alessandro Lambruschini (born 7 January 1965) is an Italian former long-distance runner who specialized in the 3000 metres steeplechase

Biography
Lambruschini participated at three editions of the Summer Olympics (1988, 1992, 1996), he has 40 caps in national team from 1985 to 1998. He in 3000 metres steeplechase won 17 in international athletics competitions, including two at the IAAF World Cup and eight in the European Cup. After his retirement from competitions, he is dedicated to the duathlon also getting good results in the master categories.

Achievements

1Representing Europe

National titles
Lambruschini is a ten-time individual national champion.
2 wins in 1500 metres (1986, 1993)
6 wins in 3000 metres steeplechase (1986, 1987, 1990, 1992, 1994, 1996)
2 wins in 3000 metres indoor (1991, 1992)

Personal life
Lambruschini was in a relationship with American footballer Jill Rutten while she played in Italy.

See also
 Italian all-time lists - 1500 metres
 Italian all-time lists - 3000 metres steeplechase
 FIDAL Hall of Fame
 Italy national athletics team – Most caps

References

External links
 
 

1965 births
Living people
People from Fucecchio
Italian male long-distance runners
Italian male steeplechase runners
Olympic athletes of Italy
Olympic bronze medalists for Italy
Athletes (track and field) at the 1988 Summer Olympics
Athletes (track and field) at the 1992 Summer Olympics
Athletes (track and field) at the 1996 Summer Olympics
World Athletics Championships athletes for Italy
World Athletics Championships medalists
European Athletics Championships medalists
Athletics competitors of Fiamme Oro
Medalists at the 1996 Summer Olympics
Olympic bronze medalists in athletics (track and field)
Mediterranean Games gold medalists for Italy
Mediterranean Games silver medalists for Italy
Athletes (track and field) at the 1987 Mediterranean Games
Mediterranean Games medalists in athletics
Sportspeople from the Metropolitan City of Florence